Amasia Entertainment is a Los Angeles based entertainment company founded in 2012 by Michael A. Helfant and Bradley Gallo. It specializes in film and television production.

Prior to Amasia Entertainment, both Helfant and Gallo were a part of the production company Troika Pictures, where the two first started working together. Previously, Michael Helfant served as President/COO of Marvel Studios overseeing live-action and animation productions and helped to launch the first slate of Marvel self-financed films including Iron Man and The Incredible Hulk. Bradley Gallo began his career as an independent filmmaker with the comedy-drama Magic Rock. After graduating from Columbia University he went on to work at CNN and produced such shows as Anderson Cooper 360 and American Morning before getting hired at Troika Pictures as the Head of Production and Development.

History

Founding
Amasia Entertainment was founded in 2012 by film veteran Michael A. Helfant and Bradley Gallo. They hired Josh Sathre as production executive in 2016 and in February 2017, Amasia Entertainment announced that it would start a television division led by Tracy Mercer.

Film 
Amasia marked its first theatrical release with the Halle Berry thriller, The Call. In 2016, the company financed and produced the action-comedy film Mr. Right. Their following non-theatrical releases included Elizabeth Allen Rosenbaum's Careful What You Wish For, Vincent Masciale's “Fear, Inc,” and David Gleeson's Don’t Go. In August 2017, it was announced that Amasia Entertainment would co-produce Britt Poulton and Dan Madison Savage's drama Them That Follow with Gerard Butler's production company, G-Base. The film stars Alice Englert, Walton Goggins, Thomas Mann, Olivia Colman, Lewis Pullman, Jim Gaffigan and Kaitlyn Dever. It made its world premiered to favorable reviews in the Dramatic Competition at the 2019 Sundance Film Festival.

Television
In September 2019, Amasia began development on Dark Shadows: Reincarnation, a follow-up to the 1960s gothic soap opera Dark Shadows, with Mark B. Perry as writer.

Future Projects 
In March 2017, Amasia Entertainment obtained the film adaptation rights to Emil Ferris' graphic novel My Favorite Thing Is Monsters for Columbia Pictures.

In September 2019, filming began on the Amasia Entertainment produced feature drama, Wild Mountain Thyme, with John Patrick Shanley as director. The film stars Emily Blunt and is currently in post-production.

In January 2020, Amasia acquired the rights to produce The Green Hornet reboot, and on April 16, 2020, Universal Pictures agreed to distribute the film.

Filmography

Released

Upcoming films

Television

See also

 STX Entertainment
 Neon 
 Studio 8
 Annapurna Pictures
 Blumhouse Productions

References

External links

Film production companies of the United States